The Catalans Dragons (French: Dragons Catalans, Catalan: Dracs Catalans) are a professional rugby league club from Perpignan, Pyrénées-Orientales department, France. The team competes in the Super League and are the only team from outside England. The Dragons play regular home games at Stade Gilbert Brutus in the centre of the city. Catalans Dragons are the first non-British team to win the Challenge Cup since the competition started in 1896, after beating Warrington Wolves 20–14 at Wembley Stadium on 25 August 2018.

The club was formed in 2000 by a merger of XIII Catalan and AS Saint-Estève into Union Treiziste Catalane (UTC). They won the 2005 French Championship and the Lord Derby Cup in 2004 and 2005. In 2006, they were granted a Super League licence, taking the name Catalans Dragons. UTC continues to compete in the French Championship's Elite One Championship as a feeder club for the Dragons, now under the name Saint-Estève XIII Catalan.

History

2000–2004: foundation
The club was founded in 2000 after the merger of two teams in Perpignan, XIII Catalan and AS Saint Estève. The merged team took the name Union Treiziste Catalane, often abbreviated to UTC.

XIII Catalan were founded in 1935 and thus were founding members of the French Championship. During their run, they won 11 French Championships and 11 Lord Derby Cups. AS Saint-Estève were founded in 1965. They won six championships and four Lord Derby Cups. There were two other clubs in the twelve-team competition in Pyrénées-Orientales: Pia XIII and Saint-Cyprien. In 2002 Saint-Cyprien joined the merged UTC side. UTC won the 2005 French Championship and the 2004 and 2005 Lord Derby Cups.

2005–2007: Super League and Challenge Cup final
In 2005, UTC applied to join the Super League, the highest tier of professional rugby league in Europe. They were selected ahead of Toulouse Olympique and Villeneuve Leopards to enter the league for the 2006 season. The franchise was named Catalans Dragons; UTC remained in the French Championship to serve as a reserve club. The club set a target for 75% of the players be qualified to play for France.

The Catalans are not the first French side to play in the Super League, but the first, Paris Saint-Germain, lasted only two seasons. Both rugby codes have their stronghold in the southwest of France, and the north of France is more football-friendly. Players on loan from French league clubs had to play for their own clubs as well, train in the south and take the long journey to Paris or England for matches.

To ensure that the Catalans had the best French players available to them, the French rugby league decided to let them sign players from other French clubs without paying a transfer fee. The league also would not relegate them from the Super League for three years, even if they finished last. Many believe that the Catalans will be joined by other French clubs in the Super League, but the whole idea of expanding into France had critics. The Catalans won their first ever Super League match 38–30 against Wigan on 11 February 2006, at Stade Aimé Giral. The club encountered a steep learning curve in their first season in the Super League. Many of less experienced French players suffered from tiredness towards the end of a gruelling, injury-marred campaign. A particular loss was that of key playmaker and captain Stacey Jones, who missed much of the season with a broken arm. The team eventually finished bottom of the table, but the three-year exemption from relegation kept them in the Super League.

The year 2007 saw a strong recruitment by new coach Mick Potter with a string of high-profile signings from Australia, including Clint Greenshields, Casey McGuire, Jason Croker and Aaron Gorrell, all seasoned NRL campaigners. Gorrell, a goalkicking 'hooker',  impressed in the first month but sustained a bad knee injury in February's win over Leeds and missed the rest of the season. On 10 March 2007, it was announced that Newcastle Knights hooker Luke Quigley would cover Gorrell's absence for the remainder of the campaign, but a number of players sustained injuries throughout the campaign.

On 29 July 2007, the Catalans became the first French side and first non-British side to reach the final of the Challenge Cup after beating Wigan 37–24 in the semifinal. The Catalans lost the 2007 Challenge Cup Final with St. Helens at Wembley Stadium on 25 August 2007. They also managed to finish the 2007 season off the bottom of the table, ending the season in a respectable tenth place.

2008–2017: playoffs and progression

In 2008, the Catalans secured their first playoff berth by finishing third on the league ladder largely on the back of a ferocious forward pack. They smashed Warrington 46–8 in their first-ever playoff match on 13 September in Perpignan, but 20 September saw Wigan blow open what had been a close game in the second half of their elimination semifinal, with Wigan ultimately winning 50–26. Coach Mick Potter left the Dragons at the end of the 2008 season to replace Daniel Anderson at St Helens.

In 2009, they were involved in two historic milestones for the sport of rugby league in Europe. During their match away to the Welsh club Crusaders on 23 May, the two clubs played the first Super League match to not feature an English team. History was also created on 20 June, when the club played in the first Super League game to be played in Spain, at Barcelona's Estadi Olímpic Lluís Companys, the venue for the 1992 Summer Olympics, against Warrington. The Dragons led 10–6 at halftime, but Warrington finished as the winners 12–24. The purpose of the latter fixture was to promote the sport in Catalonia, with around 1000 tickets being sold in the local area, and the game was televised on the Catalan channel El 33. Immediately after the game, Walters commented that the event in Spain could become an annual one, apparently complementing comments made by the club's general manager about using a new high-speed link between Perpignan and Spain, supposed to start running within two years.

In 2016 Catalans Dragons celebrated ten years in the Super League competition. After a recruitment drive, which saw a number of transfers from the NRL, expectations were high. After opening defeats to Wigan and Hull FC, the Dragons edged Leeds 32–28 in round three and then took seven wins from their next eight matches. Following their 42–32 win over Salford at the end of April, Laurent Frayssinous' side sat second in the table, level on points with leaders Warrington. However, a series of injury setbacks to key players in the second half of the season saw them drop down the table. Catalans lost their final six regular season games which meant they headed into the Super 8s two points adrift of fourth-placed St Helens. Five defeats from seven saw them finish the season in sixth place and miss out on a play-off spot. After a difficult two years at Huddersfield, Jodie Broughton's move to the south of France saw him kick-start his career. The winger scored 19 tries in 2016 including four in the Dragons' 30–12 win over St Helens in April. Todd Carney was released after two seasons at Catalans.

2018–present: Success
On 25 August 2018, Catalans Dragons won their first Rugby League trophy, after defeating Warrington 20–14 in the 2018 Challenge Cup Final, in the process becoming the first non-English team to win the competition in its long, illustrious history.

During the 2019 season, Catalans Dragons held their home match against Wigan at the Camp Nou in Barcelona. The match was the first Super League game in Spain and attracted a record attendance for a Super League game outside of the Grand Final of 31,555. The game resulted in a 33–16 victory for the Dragons.

On 28 January 2020, Catalans Dragons announced that they had signed Israel Folau despite him holding to the Biblical teaching that those who practice homosexuality without repenting will go to hell (going so far as to suggest that the 2019–20 Australian bushfires were God's judgment on Australia for allowing same sex marriage and abortion).
Wigan Warriors responded by saying that their next game against Catalans would be named Pride Day.

In 2021, Catalans won Super League's League Leaders' Shield for the first time, following a 31–30 golden point extra time victory over reigning champions St Helens during Magic Weekend.  On 9 October 2021, Catalans played in their first ever Super League grand final with the opponents being reigning champions St Helens.  Catalans lead the match in the second half but a try late to St Helens saw Catalans lose 12–10.
In the 2022 Super League season, Catalans finished 4th on the table and qualified for the playoffs. The club would be eliminated from the playoffs in the first week, suffering a shock 20-10 loss against Leeds.

Stadiums

Stade Aimé Giral: 2006–2007

The Catalans moved into the stadium in 2006, when they were accepted into Super League. They ground shared with rugby union side USA Perpignan, which own and operate the stadium, but it is a multipurpose stadium used occasionally for other sports and events.

Stade Gilbert Brutus: 2007–present

The Stade Gilbert Brutus was opened in 1962 and has hosted mostly rugby league and union and hosted numerous test matches involving the French national team. It was previously the home to Northern Catalonia rugby league team. When the Dragons moved in the capacity was just over 4000.
 
The Catalans have redeveloped and expanded the ground to 13,000 since they moved here.

Kit sponsors and manufacturers

2023 squad

2023 transfers

Gains

Losses

Players

Coaches

Seasons

Honours

League
 French Rugby League Championship / Elite One Championship:
Grand Final:
Winners (1): 2004–05Runners-up (2): 2001–02, 2003–04
League Leaders (2): 2003–04, 2004–05
 Super League
Grand Final:
Runners-up (1): 2021
League Leaders' Shield:
Winners (1): 2021

Cups
 Lord Derby Cup: 
Winners (3): 2000–01, 2003–04, 2004–05
 Challenge Cup: 
Winners (1): 2018Runners-up (1): 2007

Other
 Million Pound Game:
Winners (1): 2017

See also
Saint-Estève XIII Catalan

References

External links 

 Catalans Dragons official site  — under construction: 
 Catalans Dragons at Superleague.co.uk
 The World of Rugby League
 League Unlimited
 Catalans Dragons stats at rugbyleagueproject.com

 
French rugby league teams
Rugby clubs established in 2000
Super League teams
Sport in Perpignan
2000 establishments in France
Rugby league in Catalonia